Alexander Alexeyevich Shenshin (1890–1944) was a Russian composer.

Shenshin studied music with Boleslav Yavorsky, Alexander Gretchaninov, Reinhold Glière, and Semyon Kruglikov from 1907 to 1915. He received a teacher's appointment to the Moscow Conservatory in 1922, and by 1940 he was a member of the Academy of Arts and the composer of the Moscow Children's Theater.

Shenshin was a member of the first Presidium of the Moscow Institute of Artistic Culture and a close friend of its president, Wassily Kandinsky, a noted painter who shared an interest in using scientific methods to further a synthesis of the arts. Kandinsky praised Shenshin's theoretical work, in particular an analysis of two parts of Liszt's composition Années de Pèlerinage: the "Sposalizio", inspired by Raphael's painting The Marriage of the Virgin, and the "Penseroso", inspired by Michelangelo's statue atop the tomb of Lorenzo II de' Medici, Duke of Urbino. Shenshin counted the notes and bars in the music and translated them into graphic form, and he measured the corresponding painting and sculpture, linking them to the same mathematical formula.

Works

Piano
14 Preludes (1910)
17 Preludes (1910)
Op.3. 7 Preludes
Op.10. 9 Preludes
Op.13. Sonata No.1 (1913)
Sonata No.2 (1926)

Voice and piano
Song Cycle after Blok
Song Cycle after Sologub
Song Cycle after Lenau (trans. Shervinsky)
Op.11. Song Cycle after Baudelaire (trans. Shervinsky)
Op.12. 5 Songs (Shervinsky)
Op.14–15 Song Cycles after German poets

Chamber ensemble
Piano Quintet (1911)
String Quartet (1943)

Orchestral
Symphonic poem Ийола (1918)
Summer pictures. Lyric Suite for Symphony Orchestra (for K. D. Balmont, 1929)

Opera
O-Tao (1925)

Operetta
Twelfth Night (1939, Moscow Operetta Theater)

Ballet
Ancient Dances (Dionysus, 1933, Bolshoi Theatre)
Tale of Carmen (1935)

Film
The Ghost That Never Returns (1929)
Tommy (1931)

References

External links
 

1890 births
1944 deaths
Russian composers
Russian male composers
20th-century composers
20th-century Russian male musicians